Capital punishment is a legal penalty in Nigeria.

Justification 
The death penalty is authorized by Section 33 of the Constitution of Nigeria. Capital crimes include murder, terrorism-related offenses, rape, robbery, kidnapping, sodomy, homosexuality, blasphemy, adultery, incest, assisting the suicide of a person legally unable to consent, perjury in a capital case causing wrongful execution, treason, some military offences like mutiny and practice of indigenous beliefs in states applying Shariah law.

Pregnant women and people younger than 18 may not be sentenced to death. If convicted of a capital offence, they will instead be sentenced to life imprisonment.

Methods 
Methods of executions include hanging, shooting, stoning, and since 2015, lethal injection.

History 
During the Nigerian military juntas of 1966–79 and 1983–98, the government executed its political opponents, most notoriously when General Sani Abacha ordered the execution of the Ogoni Nine by hanging in 1995.

21st century 
Since the transition to democracy in 1999, death sentences are often given but rarely carried out. After 2006, no executions took place until June 2013, when four prisoners on death row were hanged, although about a thousand other condemned prisoners were awaiting execution at the time. The next executions occurred in 2016, when three men were hanged for murder and armed robbery.

On 17 December 2014, after being found guilty of conspiracy to commit mutiny, 54 Nigerian soldiers were sentenced to death by firing squad. The trial was held secretly by a military tribunal.

The use of the death penalty in Nigeria has generated debate. In October 2014, former Delta State Governor Emmanuel Uduaghan pardoned three inmates who were on death row following the recommendations by the State Advisory Council on Prerogative of Mercy. In 2017, the Nigerian government rejected the call by Amnesty International to halt the planned execution of some inmates in Lagos State.

In May 2020, during the coronavirus pandemic, a court in Lagos used a video conferencing application to issue a death sentence.

See also

 Crime in Nigeria
 Law of Nigeria

Further reading

References

Further reading
Whitehead, Eleanor. "Nigeria's addiction to the death sentence." Al Jazeera. August 11, 2015.

External links

Nigeria: Death Penalty Worldwide
"SYND 25/04/1971 CONDEMNED MEN ARE EXECUTED IN NIGERIA ." Associated Press.

 
Crime in Nigeria
Law of Nigeria